Hüseyin Velioğlu (born Hüseyin Durmaz; 1952 – 17 January 2000) was the leader of the Kurdish Hezbollah, a militant extremist organization in the early 1990s. Velioğlu led one of the wings of this organization. He was killed in a police operation in the Beykoz district of Istanbul on 17 January 2000.

Life 
Velioğlu was born Hüseyin Durmaz in Batman Province in 1952. He was of Kurdish origin. He changed his last name to Velioğlu in 1978. He studied at the Faculty of Political Sciences of the University of Ankara. In 1980, he moved to Diyarbakır, and in 1987, founded Kurdish Hezbollah. When it came to disagreements within the organization, Velioğlu belonged to the leader of the so-called Ilim-wing. This wing was involved in the armed struggle to enforce their goal to overthrow the government and install an Islamic regime. However, this group is unrelated to Lebanese Hezbollah. Velioğlu was killed in a villa during the gun battle between people in the villa and the police.

References

1952 births
2000 deaths
Kurdish activists
People from Batman, Turkey
People shot dead by law enforcement officers
Ankara University Faculty of Political Sciences alumni
Leaders of Islamic terror groups